Michael Kent Hooper (born 29 October 1991) is an Australian professional rugby union player who is captain of the Australia national team, the Wallabies. His playing position is openside flanker.

Hooper is one of Australia's most-capped players of all time and currently plays for the New South Wales Waratahs in Super Rugby. Hooper has previously represented the Brumbies and Toyota Verblitz in his professional career.

Early life 
Hooper was born on 29 October 1991 in Sydney, and played his junior rugby at the Manly Roos like other former Wallabies such as George Smith. Hooper represented Australia under 20 at the 2011 IRB Junior World Championship where he captained the side at times and was named International Player of the Tournament.

Professional career

Super Rugby 

Hooper made his Brumbies debut in 2010, as stand-in for the injured George Smith.

After a breakout season for the Brumbies in 2012, he was signed by the New South Wales Waratahs for the 2013 season. 2012 had been a standout year for Hooper who won numerous accolades including Best Forward (for the Brumbies), the ARU's Rookie of Year and placing third for the John Eales Medal after playing less than half of the polling games.

In 2013, Hooper played every Waratahs Super Rugby game of the season and he won the Australian Super 15 Player of the Year award, as well as the Waratahs' Player of the Year award.

On 1 March 2014, Hooper was named captain for the Waratahs' clash with the Queensland Reds after team regular Dave Dennis was ruled out due to injury received in the Waratahs' first game of 2014 against the Western Force. Hooper led the Waratahs to a 32–5 win over the Reds at ANZ Stadium and went on to play all the remaining games of the 2014 season including the Grand Final against the Crusaders in which he captained the side to a 33–32 win at ANZ Stadium.

Top League 
In August 2020 it was announced that Hooper had signed to play for the Japanese Top League club Toyota Verblitz for the 2020–21 season, marking his first serious move to play domestic rugby outside the Super Rugby since starting his career with the Brumbies in 2010.

International 

On 5 June 2012, Hooper made his international debut for Australia, coming off the bench (in the 65th minute) against Scotland in Newcastle. Following a knee injury to regular flanker and captain David Pocock, Hooper started in every Test game until the final Spring-Tour game (and Nathan Sharpe's final Wallabies game) against Wales in Cardiff, where he started from the bench to make-way for David Pocock. Hooper won Wallabies 'Rookie of the year' award at the annual John Eales Medal awards evening event.

In 2013, when David Pocock suffered a season-ending knee injury; Hooper played in all of the Wallabies Test matches and had an outstanding year, winning the John Eales Medal as 'Wallabies player of the year'.

In 2014, Pocock suffered another season-ending knee injury and in Ewen McKenzie's second year as Wallabies coach, McKenzie named Hooper as vice-captain with his Waratahs team-mate Adam Ashley-Cooper and his former Brumbies team-mate Stephen Moore was named as Australia captain for the 2014 three-test June series against France. However, when captain Stephen Moore left the field with a knee injury in the 5th minute, Hooper took over the captaincy for the rest of the game. During the game, he scored a try in the first half and he had a strong performance against France in the Wallabies' 50–23 win at Suncorp Stadium. Hooper was rated was one of the best players on the field during the game by Iain Payten of foxsports.com.au and was also labelled 'the Energizer Bunny of world rugby'.

Following the season-ending injury to Stephen Moore during the first test of 2014 against France in Brisbane, Hooper was named as Wallabies captain for the rest of the 2014 Test-season, meaning that he was the Wallabies 82nd Test captain and the youngest player (age 22, 223 days) to captain the side since Ken Catchpole (age 21, 354 days) in 1961.

Following another strong 2015 Super Rugby season, Hooper was awarded the Peoples Choice – Wallaby of the Year at the John Eales Medal awards night for the second year in a row. He also kept his starting position safe, forcing David Pocock into Number 8 after returning from injury. He was also selected in the 31-man 2015 Rugby World Cup squad.

In 2016 Hooper was again awarded the John Eales Medal, the 4th player to have won it a second time.

Hooper became the full-time Wallabies captain for the 2017 Rugby Championship, following Stephen Moore announcing that the 2017 season would be his final year of test rugby.

His very rough playing style has led Hooper to collect eight yellow cards in his international career, matched in this unenviable record only by the Georgian Viktor Kolelishvili.

In 2020, Hooper played his 100th test for Australia, becoming the fastest Wallaby to reach 100 tests. He also became the youngest-ever player to reach 100 tests for his country, although his record was later broken by Wales' centre, George North. Hooper's 100th test was a 16–16 draw with New Zealand, at the Wellington Regional Stadium. He went on to play all 6 of Australia's tests in 2020, under the new Head Coach, Dave Rennie.

In 2021, Hooper surpassed George Gregan's record for the most caps as Wallabies captain, 60.

Statistics

Honours 

Waratahs

 Super Rugby Champions: 2014
 Australian Conference Champions (3): 2014, 2015, 2018
 Play-off Appearances (4): 2011, 2014, 2015, 2018

Australia 

 Rugby Championship Champions: 2015
 Mandela Challenge Plate (6): 2012,2015–2018,2021
 Rugby World Cup Runners Up: 2015

Personal life 
His father is from Kent, England. Hooper grew up in Collaroy on the Northern Beaches of Sydney.

References

External links
 
 Michael Hooper at Wallabies
 Wallabies profile
 Waratahs profile

1991 births
Australia international rugby union players
Rugby union players from Sydney
Australian rugby union captains
ACT Brumbies players
New South Wales Waratahs players
Rugby union flankers
Living people
Australian people of English descent
People educated at St Pius X College, Sydney
Sydney (NRC team) players
Toyota Verblitz players